Zinnia Kumar, also known as Zinnia, is an Australian fashion model, CIEEM accredited ecologist, colorism and ethnic representation advocate

Scientific research
Kumar has published two original scientific research papers on negative frequency-dependant selection on human traits: the first about men's facial hair and the second on women's hair colour. Zinnia's study of attractiveness of facial hair in men was the first time negative frequency dependant selection had been applied to a human trait, since Charles Darwin coined the term. The published paper found that attractiveness varies with novelty, less common facial hair types were considered most attractive by men and women. This research went viral on the internet and was covered by many news outlets BBC, The Washington Post, Time, The Guardian, Science Magazine and Forbes, coining a new social term 'Peak Beard'[1].

Ecologist
Zinnia is a field conservation ecologist having worked with Little Blue Penguins, invertebrates and wetland birds for the EPA, Birdlife and Department of Environment among others. She is a former Australian Museum science communicator. Zinnia is a CIEEM accredited Ecologist, sustainability consultant and is the CEO and founder of ecology, sustainability and inclusion consultancy 'The Dotted Line' .

Fashion model 
Zinnia Kumar is the first ecologist to cover any international edition of Vogue Magazine in 128 years. She is the first Indian and the first South Asian Australian to cover Australian Vogue in 62 years. Zinnia appeared on the Porter Magazine August 2021 cover and was labelled 'Force of Nature'. Zinnia was named the 50 Most Influential Global Indians by Vogue India in 2019. In 2021 Zinnia was nominated as a Social Mover and change maker by models.com.

Zinnia has worked for Tommy Hilfiger, MSGM, Off-White, H&M, Interview Magazine, Another Magazine, Vogue India, Vogue Australia,  Harpers Bazaar among others.

Filmography

Colorism and ethnic representation
Zinnia Kumar is a vocal colorism and ethnic representation advocate, with a documentary on the topic currently in production. Zinnia is interested in decolonising and deconstructing beauty ideals and histories of scientific racism. She has researched how colorism disempowers women whilst at the University of Oxford. Her beauty advocacy involves educating, writing & speaking using mixed media.

Education and empowerment
Zinnia has a keen interest in educational access as a tool for transformation. Zinnia spent a decade empowering refugee and disadvantaged children in Australia, India and Thailand. She was selected by the Department of Foreign Affairs as a youth ambassador and is a Rotary Youth Leadership Awardee.

Motivational talks and keynotes
Zinnia grew up with social anxiety she over came it by  training in speaking & presenting at NIDA & RADA, she has been a member of Toastmasters International (Public Speaking Society) for a decade and is a member of The Oxford Union. She has presented, spoken and delivered keynotes for British Fashion Council, Vogue, Cancer Council, H&M, Australasian Evolution Society, Australian Museum, The Australian among others. Her work covers motivational speaking and advocacy in beauty, inclusion, education, sustainability and female empowerment.

Early life 
Zinnia Kumar was born in Sydney, Australia to Indian parents and grew up in Sydney's south-western suburbs.  She attended a disadvantaged high school and self learned her final year studies. Zinnia Kumar attended University of New South Wales for a Bachelor of Advanced Science, with First Class honours,  Brasenose College, Oxford University for an MPhil in Modern South Asian Studies, and  MSc in Industrial, Organisational and Business Psychology at University College London focusing on sustainability and CSR.

References

Living people
1995 births
Zinnia Kumar
Models from Sydney
Australian biologists
University of New South Wales alumni
Australian media personalities
21st-century Australian actresses
Australian people of Indian descent
Indian diaspora in Australia
Australia–India relations